The double-banded greytail (Xenerpestes minlosi) is a species of bird in the family Furnariidae. It is found in Colombia, Ecuador, and Panama. Its natural habitats are subtropical or tropical moist lowland forest and subtropical or tropical moist montane forest.

References

double-banded greytail
Birds of Colombia
Birds of the Tumbes-Chocó-Magdalena
double-banded greytail
Taxonomy articles created by Polbot